Elliptoleus is a genus of beetles in the family Carabidae, containing the following species:

 Elliptoleus acutesculptus Bates, 1882
 Elliptoleus balli Liebherr, 1991
 Elliptoleus corvus Liebherr, 1991
 Elliptoleus crepericornis Bates, 1882
 Elliptoleus curtulus Bates, 1882
 Elliptoleus luteipes Csiki, 1931
 Elliptoleus olisthopoides Bates, 1891
 Elliptoleus tequilae Liebherr, 1991
 Elliptoleus vixstriatus (Bates, 1878)
 Elliptoleus whiteheadi Liebherr, 1991
 Elliptoleus zapotecorum Liebherr, 1991

References

Platyninae